Nikolskoye is a rural locality (a selo) in Nikolo-Komarovsky Selsoviet, Kamyzyaksky District, Astrakhan Oblast, Russia. The population was 793 as of 2010. There are 22 streets.

Geography 
Nikolskoye is located 35 km northwest of Kamyzyak (the district's administrative centre) by road. Posyolok moryakov is the nearest rural locality.

References 

Rural localities in Kamyzyaksky District